Elizabeth Tadich (born 11 October 1976) is a former Australian racing cyclist. She won the Australian national road race title in 1995. She also accomplished 2nd in World Championships WE - Road Race ('97).  Elizabeth married James Taylor and had two children in 2007 and 2011.

References

External links

1976 births
Living people
Australian female cyclists
Place of birth missing (living people)